Pusionella nifat is a species of sea snail, a marine gastropod mollusk in the family Clavatulidae.

Description
The whorls are usually narrowly shouldered above. The shell is whitish under a light olivaceous, thin epidermis, with several revolving series of square chestnut spots. The base is constricted, with a few engraved striae. The shouldered form is Pusionella nifat scalarina

This species differs from Pusionella vulpina by its median white band.

Distribution
This species occurs in the Atlantic Ocean off West Africa (Gabon, Cameroon) and Angola. Living species have been dredged up in the Mediterranean Sea off Algeria.

References

 Lamarck J.B. (1816). Liste des objets représentés dans les planches de cette livraison. In: Tableau encyclopédique et méthodique des trois règnes de la Nature. Mollusques et Polypes divers. Agasse, Paris. 16 pp.
 Gofas, S.; Afonso, J.P.; Brandào, M. (Ed.). (S.a.). Conchas e Moluscos de Angola = Coquillages et Mollusques d'Angola. [Shells and molluscs of Angola]. Universidade Agostinho / Elf Aquitaine Angola: Angola. 140 pp.
 Bernard, P.A. (Ed.) (1984). Coquillages du Gabon [Shells of Gabon]. Pierre A. Bernard: Libreville, Gabon. 140, 75 plates pp.

External links
 

nifat
Gastropods described in 1789